Tetrosomus is a genus of boxfishes native to the Indian and western Pacific Oceans.

Species
There are currently four recognized species in this genus:

 Tetrosomus concatenatus (Bloch, 1785) (Triangular boxfish)
 Tetrosomus gibbosus (Linnaeus, 1758) (Camel cowfish)
 Tetrosomus reipublicae (Whitley, 1930) (Smallspine turretfish)
 Tetrosomus stellifer  (Bloch & Schneider, 1801)

References

Ostraciidae
Marine fish genera
Taxa named by William John Swainson